Balthasar (Baltazar) van der Veen (1596 – 1660) was a Dutch Golden Age landscape painter. He was a son of Balthasar van der Veen, a merchant from Antwerp
This merchant was the brother of Walewijn van der Veen the Notary Public in New Amsterdam and Jan van der Veen, the popular poet from the 1600s. Balthasar, the painter, is mentioned in Jan van der Veen's poem as his nephew. The poem was written for his wedding with Grietje Schaaps, page 319

Van der Veen was born in Amsterdam where he was registered in 1620. He worked in Gorinchem during the years 1637 - 1639 and then travelled south to France and further to Italy, but was back in Amsterdam by 1657 when he became a member of the Guild of St. Luke there.
He is known for landscapes after Cornelis Gerritsz Decker, Wouter Knijff, and Roelof Jansz van Vries.
Van der Veen probably died in Haarlem.

References

1596 births
1660 deaths
Dutch Golden Age painters
Dutch male painters
Painters from Amsterdam